The Sligo Under-21 Football Championship is an annual Gaelic Athletic Association competition between the Under-21 panels of the clubs in Sligo. Up to 2006 this was the Under-21 Championship, but a decision was taken to hold the Championship a year earlier (i.e. for Under-20s), therefore there were two Championships in 2006 - an Under-21 Championship (won by Ballymote), and the Under-20 competition, in which Tourlestrane defeated Eastern Harps in the final. No competition was held in 2014 as it was decided to re-instate the competition in its Under-21 format for 2015. An amalgamated team of Easkey / Enniscrone are the current champions (2019).

Top winners

Roll of Honour (Under-20/21 'A' Championship)
Note - 1975-2006: Under-21, 2006–2013: Under-20, no competition in 2014, 2015-present: Under-21.

Divisional winners

County Champions shown in bold type.

Roll of Honour (Under-20/21 'B' Championship)
Note - 1998-2006: Under-21, 2006–present: Under-20.

References
Sligo GAA 125 History (2010)
Ocean FM article on 2021 u21 A final
Independent Article on 2022 u21 A Final

External links
Official Sligo Website
Sligo on Hoganstand
Sligo Club GAA

4